Moinabad (also Romanized as Mo‘īnābād) is a village in Rigestan Rural District, Zavareh District, Ardestan County, Isfahan Province, Iran. According to a census recorded in 2006, its population is 90, in 26 families.

References 

Populated places in Ardestan County